The Men's individual normal hill competition at the FIS Nordic World Ski Championships 2021 was held on 27 February. A qualification was held on 26 February 2021.

Results

Qualification
The qualification was held on 26 February at 20:30.

Final
The first round was started on 27 February at 16:30 and the final round at 17:40.

References

Men's individual normal hill